Occident is a 2002 Romanian film directed by Cristian Mungiu. It stars Alexandru Papadopol as a 29-year-old man named Luci and Anca Androne as his wife Sorina. The film is a tragicomedy about young people who move to the West when they are not financially successful in Romania.

Cast
Alexandru Papadopol as Luci
Anca-Ioana Androne as Sorina
Samuel Tastet as Jérôme
Tania Popa as Mihaela
Coca Bloos as Mihaela's mother
Julieta Strîmbeanu as Granny
Eugenia Bosânceanu as Aunt Leana
Ioan Gyuri Pascu as Gică
Valeriu Andriuţă as Nae
Nicolongo as Luigi
Dorel Vișan as The cop
Gabriel Spahiu as The mute Spaniard
Michael Beck as The Dutchman
Jérôme Bounkazi as The Italian
Tora Vasilescu as The school-mistress

See also
Romanian New Wave

References

External links

Description of film

2002 films
Romanian comedy-drama films
2000s Romanian-language films
Films directed by Cristian Mungiu